Qeshlaq-e Sabz Ali (also Romanized as Qeshlāq-e Sabz ‘Alī) is a village in Khoshkrud Rural District, in the Central District of Zarandieh County, Markazi Province, Iran. At the 2006 census, its population was 44, in 8 families.

References 

Populated places in Zarandieh County